Kent Byron Rogers (July 31, 1923 – July 9, 1944) was an American actor who appeared in several live-action features and shorts, and a voice actor for Warner Bros. Cartoons and Walter Lantz Productions.

Career
For Warner Bros. Cartoons, Rogers portrayed several Hollywood stars in Hollywood Steps Out, and lent his voice to The Heckling Hare, Porky's Pastry Pirates, Horton Hatches the Egg, The Squawkin' Hawk and Super-Rabbit. Rogers also provided the original voice of Beaky Buzzard in Bugs Bunny Gets the Boid and The Bashful Buzzard. He also provided the voice of Junior Bear in Bugs Bunny and the Three Bears, the initial 1944 entry of Chuck Jones' The Three Bears series. He also appeared occasionally on radio sitcoms, generally doing one-off characters.

In 1941, he had a rare on-camera role as Henry, a boy who had a talent for doing impressions, in the film All-American Co-Ed.

For Walter Lantz Productions he voiced Woody Woodpecker in five theatrical cartoon shorts released from 1942 to 1943.

Rogers' career ended upon his enlistment in the Navy in late 1943.

Death
Rogers was killed in the crash of a training flight at Pensacola, Florida, while he was an Ensign in the United States Navy during World War II, on July 9, 1944, 22 days before his 21st birthday. Stan Freberg then replaced Rogers as the voice of Junior Bear, while Mel Blanc took over as the voice of Beaky Buzzard, though that character's appearances were limited after Rogers' death.

Rogers is buried in the National Memorial Cemetery of the Pacific in Honolulu, Hawaii.

Filmography

References

External links
 
 

1923 births
1944 deaths
20th-century American comedians
20th-century American male actors
American impressionists (entertainers)
American male child actors
American male radio actors
American male voice actors
Burials in the National Memorial Cemetery of the Pacific
Comedians from Virginia
Metro-Goldwyn-Mayer cartoon studio people
People from Virginia Beach, Virginia
United States Navy personnel killed in World War II
Victims of aviation accidents or incidents in 1944
Victims of aviation accidents or incidents in the United States
Walter Lantz Productions people
Warner Bros. Cartoons voice actors